Wilbur Schwichtenberg (July 12, 1912 – July 15, 1989), known professionally as Will Bradley, was an American trombonist and bandleader during the 1930s and 1940s. He performed swing, dance music, and boogie-woogie songs, many of them written by Don Raye.

Career
Born in Newton, New Jersey, Bradley was raised in Washington, New Jersey. In 1928, he moved to New York City and became a member of bands such as Red Nichols & His Five Pennies. During the 1930s, he was a studio musician for CBS except for one year with the Ray Noble orchestra.

In 1939, he started a big band with Ray McKinley, a swing drummer and vocalist from Texas, and changed his name from Schwichtenberg to Will Bradley. The band included Freddie Slack, Arthur Rollini, Peanuts Hucko, Lee Castle, and Pete Candoli. Vocalists included Terry Allen, Carlotta Dale, Lynn Gardner, Steve Jordan, Ray McKinley, Phyllis Myles, Larry Southern, and Jimmy Valentine.

The Bradley band became well known for boogie-woogie, particularly with its hit record, "Beat Me Daddy, Eight to the Bar". The song reached the top ten of Billboard magazine's popular music chart, as did "Scrub Me Mama with a Boogie Beat" and "Down the Road a Piece". The latter song was recorded by the Will Bradley Trio, consisting of McKinley, Slack, and Doc Goldberg, with guest vocals by songwriter Don Raye.

In 1942, McKinley departed to form his own band. Bradley hired trumpeter Shorty Rogers and drummer Shelly Manne, but many members wound up in the military due to the draft, and the band dissolved. For the rest of his music career, Bradley composed chamber music and orchestral works.
Will Bradley was also a trombonist during the record "So Rare" with Jimmy Dorsey

Death
He died on July 15, 1989, in Flemington, New Jersey, three days after his 77th birthday.

Radio
Bradley was the band leader for the Summer Silver Theater on CBS in 1941, with Ed Sullivan as the show's host.

Discography
 Boogie-Woogie (Epic, 1954)
 Jazz Encounter (Waldorf Music Hall, 1955)
 Jazz – Dixieland and Chicago Style  (Waldorf Music Hall, 1955)
 1941 (Circle, 1986)

With Ruth Brown
 Ruth Brown (Atlantic, 1957)
With Charlie Parker
 Big Band (Clef, 1954)
With Nelson Riddle
 Phil Silvers and Swinging Brass (Columbia, 1957)

References

1912 births
1989 deaths
Musicians from New Jersey
People from Newton, New Jersey
Big band bandleaders
Swing trombonists
20th-century trombonists
The Tonight Show Band members
Columbia Records artists